Evan Jones (born 5 August 1996) is a South African cricketer. He made his Twenty20 debut for Northerns in the 2019–20 CSA Provincial T20 Cup on 13 September 2019. He made his first-class debut on 17 October 2019, for Northerns in the 2019–20 CSA 3-Day Provincial Cup. He made his List A debut on 19 October 2019, for Northerns in the 2019–20 CSA Provincial One-Day Challenge. In April 2021, he was named in Northern Cape's squad, ahead of the 2021–22 cricket season in South Africa.

References

External links
 

1996 births
Living people
South African cricketers
Northerns cricketers
Place of birth missing (living people)